Speranza occiduaria is a species of geometrid moth in the family Geometridae. It is found in North America.

The MONA or Hodges number for Speranza occiduaria is 6279.

References

Further reading

External links

 

Macariini
Articles created by Qbugbot
Moths described in 1874